Chenari may refer to:

 Chenari, India, a community development block and census town in Bihar
 Chenari (Vidhan Sabha constituency), India, a constituency of the Bihar Legislative Assembly
 Chenari, Bam, Iran, a village in Kerman Province
 Chenari, Nahavand, Iran, a village in Hamadan Province